Joseph O'Connor is an Irish author and journalist.

Joseph or Joe O'Connor may also refer to:

Sportspeople
 Joe O'Connor (Gaelic footballer), Kerry player
 Joe O'Connor (Limerick hurler) (born 1967), Limerick player
 Joe O'Connor (Wexford hurler) (born 1997), Irish hurler 
 Joseph O'Connor (rower), American rowing cox at the 1976 World Rowing Championships
 Joe O'Connor (snooker player) (born 1995), English snooker player 
 Joseph O'Connor (water polo) (1904–1982), Irish Olympic water polo player
 Joe O'Connor (footballer), English footballer
 Joe O'Connor (referee) (1892–1961), American boxing referee and government official for the city of Boston

Politicians
 Joseph O'Connor (Australian politician) (1839–1913), New South Wales politician
 Joseph O'Connor (Irish politician) (1880–1941), Irish revolutionary, soldier and politician

Others
 Joseph Desmond O'Connor, British linguist and professor of phonetics
 Joseph Karr O'Connor, American computer scientist and accessibility advocate
 Joe O'Connor (actor), American actor

See also
 Joseph O'Conor (1916–2001), Anglo-Irish actor and playwright